Tom Yorke (12 July 1920 - December 2004) was a former professional rugby league footballer who played in the 1940s and 1950s.

Playing career

Notable tour matches
Tom Yorke played , and scored a try and a goal in St. Helens' 74-38 victory over Italy at Knowsley Road, St. Helens on Wednesday 30 August 1950, in front of a crowd of 14,000.

Club career
Tom Yorke made his début for St. Helens playing  in the 13-2 victory over Buslingthorpe Vale ARLFC in the 1947–48 Challenge Cup first-round second-leg match at Meanwood Road, Leeds on Saturday 14 February 1948, and he played his last match for St. Helens playing  in the 6-6 draw with York F.C. at Clarence Street, York on Saturday 18 November 1950, he made his début for Warrington on Wednesday 18 April 1951, and he played his last match for Warrington on Saturday 21 February 1953.

References

External links
Search for "Yorke" at rugbyleagueproject.org

1920 births
2004 deaths
English rugby league players
Rugby league hookers
Rugby league locks
Rugby league players from St Helens, Merseyside
Rugby league props
St Helens R.F.C. players
Warrington Wolves players